Diana Goldenberg Jiménez (born August 7, 1965 in Santiago de Cali, Colombia), better known as Diana Golden, is a Mexican actress and playwright of Colombian origin.

Filmography

References

Actresses from Cali
Actresses from Mexico City
Colombian film actresses
Colombian telenovela actresses
Colombian emigrants to Mexico
Mexican film actresses
Mexican people of Colombian descent
Mexican telenovela actresses
Naturalized citizens of Mexico
1965 births
Living people